The Observatory Building, also known as the Van Ginkel Building, was a skyscraper located in downtown Des Moines, Iowa.

With a look considered modern for its time, the building consisted of nine stories of office space, a rooftop garden including a 600-seat venue for outdoor performances, and a four-story observation tower, the distinctive feature which also gave the building its name.  Electricity and gas lighting was provided to all tenants.  Access to the tower was provided to paying customers for what was at the time an almost unique view of the city.  The installation of a beacon that would shine over the city nightly added further to the buildings uniqueness.

From its incorporation in 1896 until 1905 the head office of the Central Life Assurance Society of the United States was located in the Observatory Building.  This company is still based in Des Moines today and now known as The Aviva Life and Annuity Company

The building was eventually demolished during the latter half of 1937, and this location is now occupied by Capital Square Mall.

See also
 Des Moines, Iowa
 List of tallest buildings in Iowa

References

Office buildings completed in 1896
Skyscraper office buildings in Des Moines, Iowa
1896 establishments in Iowa
1937 disestablishments in Iowa
Buildings and structures demolished in 1937